James Geoffrey Franklin (born February 2, 1972) is an American football coach and former player. Franklin has served as the head football coach at Penn State University since 2014 and served in the same position at Vanderbilt University from 2011 to 2013.

Early years
Franklin was born in Langhorne, Pennsylvania, on February 2, 1972, to James Oliver and Jocelyn "Josie" Franklin. He attended Neshaminy High School in Langhorne, and went to college at East Stroudsburg University of Pennsylvania, where he played as a quarterback all four years. In that position, he set seven school records and was a Division II player of the year nominee in 1994. Sports Illustrated named him a National Player of the Week that season. He earned a Bachelor of Science degree in psychology in 1995. Franklin was a member of Phi Sigma Kappa fraternity while at East Stroudsburg.

Coaching career
Franklin began his coaching career in 1995 coaching wide receivers at Kutztown University of Pennsylvania. The following season, he took over as the coach of the defensive secondary for his alma mater, East Stroudsburg. That year, he was also the offensive coordinator for the Roskilde Kings of the Danish American Football Federation. In 1997, he became wide receivers coach at James Madison, and, the following year, became tight ends coach at Washington State. Franklin completed a master's degree in educational leadership at Washington State in 1999.

In 1999, he served as wide receivers coach at Idaho State. That year, the Bengals recorded 29 touchdowns, 258 receptions, and in excess of 3,300 passing yards for one of the best statistical seasons in school history. Idaho State ranked ninth nationally in total offense that year.

Franklin has also held internships at several National Football League (NFL) franchises, including the Miami Dolphins, Philadelphia Eagles, and Minnesota Vikings.

Maryland
Franklin first served at the University of Maryland as the wide receivers coach starting in 2000. In November 2000, head coach Ron Vanderlinden was dismissed and replaced by Ralph Friedgen, a Maryland alum and former Georgia Tech offensive coordinator. Friedgen retained Franklin as the wide receivers coach, one of only two assistants to be kept on the new coaching staff (running backs coach Mike Locksley was the other).

In 2003, Franklin's duties expanded to include the position of recruiting coordinator. Since then, he has been considered a top recruiter. His geographic areas of concentration for recruiting were Baltimore; Prince George's County, Maryland; Charles County, Maryland; and public schools in Washington, D.C. In 2005, Franklin departed Maryland to serve as the wide receivers coach for the Green Bay Packers of the NFL.

In 2008, he returned to Maryland as the offensive coordinator, assistant head coach, and head coach in waiting. Shortly before then coach Ralph Friedgen was fired in December 2010, he accepted the head coach position at Vanderbilt.

Kansas State
Franklin served at Kansas State University as the quarterbacks coach and offensive coordinator for the 2006 and 2007 seasons. He joined head coach Ron Prince as the first coaching staff to follow the legendary Bill Snyder. During his tenure at K-State, Franklin nurtured record setting offensive talent; including the future NFL starters quarterback Josh Freeman and All-America wide receiver Jordy Nelson. Despite impressive wins over a top 5 team and an appearance in the inaugural Texas Bowl, the Wildcat program was a far cry from the title contending teams fielded during the Snyder era. Franklin left the Wildcat coaching staff prior to Ron Prince's 2008 dismissal, and subsequent return of Coach Bill Snyder.

Vanderbilt
Vanderbilt considered Franklin a candidate for its head coaching position vacated with the forced resignation of interim coach Robbie Caldwell after the 2010 season. The Washington Post reported other candidates for the job were Al Golden of Temple and Larry Coker of UTSA (and formerly Miami), and that Franklin was not the frontrunner. After Auburn offensive coordinator Gus Malzahn turned down the job, Vanderbilt began talks to hire Franklin as its head coach. On December 17, Vanderbilt announced Franklin had been hired as head coach. Franklin was the first African American to be head coach of a major sport at Vanderbilt, and the third to be a head football coach in the Southeastern Conference (after Sylvester Croom, formerly at Mississippi State, and former Kentucky head coach Joker Phillips).

Franklin led Vanderbilt to a bowl game all three of his seasons as head coach at Vanderbilt, a team that had never previously participated in a bowl game in consecutive seasons, making him the only football coach in program history to do so.

2011 season

Franklin finished the 2011 regular season with an overall record of 6–6 and a mark of 2–6 in conference play, finishing in a tie with Kentucky for fourth place in the SEC East. They were invited to the Liberty Bowl where they were defeated by Cincinnati 31–24 to finish the season 6–7 in 2011. The 2011 seniors for the Vanderbilt football team became the first class in program history to qualify for two bowl games while at the school. Vanderbilt had only been to four bowl games in school history. After starting the season with three wins and then three losses, the third to Georgia in a close game (33–28) that proved they could be competitive. The last three regular season losses were close games — to No. 8 Arkansas 31–28, at Florida 26–21, and at Tennessee in overtime 27–21. They then lost their bowl game to 31–28. The team's only losses  by more than seven points were at No. 12 South Carolina 21–3 and at No. 2 Alabama 34–0. Vanderbilt's six wins were by an average margin of 24 points. Even with a losing record, the 2011 team outscored their opponents 347 to 281.

2012 season

In his second season (2012), the Commodores finished 9–4 and ranked in both the Associated Press and USA Today end-of-season coaches' top 25 for the first time since 1948 (and the first ranking in any week since 2008). It was only the third nine-win season in school history, also was the first time since 1935 that Vandy won five SEC games in a year and the first time in 30 years that they won at home against Tennessee.

The 2012 team had numerous milestones. The longest road winning streak (4) since 1950. Longest win streak (7) since 1948. Most times scoring 40 (5) or more points since 1915. First Vandy player Zac Stacy to rush for over 3,000 yards in career, the first time since 1949 to 1951 that Vanderbilt beat rival Ole Miss in consecutive years. Jordan Matthews set a single-season record with 1,262 yards receiving. Kicker Carey Spear scored a school record 81 points. Largest margin of victory over rival Tennessee (23) 41–18 since 1954 (26–0). Largest margin of victory against secondary rival Kentucky (40) since 1916 when Vanderbilt won 45–0. First time a Vanderbilt team went to a bowl in back-to-back years. First win at home vs. Tennessee in 30 years. First 8-win season since 1982. Longest rush from scrimmage — 90 yards by Zac Stacy. First winning record in the regular season since 1982. Four straight wins in SEC play for the first time since 1949. The first time in Vanderbilt history a player (Zac Stacy) had rushed for over 1,000 yards back to back years. The first 9 win season since 1915.

Franklin, convinced of the strength of Southeastern Conference football, ranked three SEC teams — Alabama, Georgia, and Florida — ahead of the consensus Number 1 Notre Dame in the final regular-season coaches poll for 2012.

2013 season

For the third straight year, Vanderbilt made it to a bowl game. Vandy defeated Houston Cougars in the BBVA Compass Bowl 41–24. Vanderbilt finished with 9 wins in consecutive years for the first time in school history, and was also ranked in the top 25 of AP and Coaches polls in back-to-back years for the first time.

Four Vanderbilt football players were arrested on August 9, 2013, and charged with five counts of aggravated rape and two counts of aggravated sexual battery. They took graphic photos and videos of the rape. BuzzFeed reported that Franklin encouraged  a player to delete graphic footage of the rape after viewing it. Franklin denied the accusation. In court testimony, Franklin admitted to changing his story about whether he told Vanderbilt players that he had viewed a video recording of the incident.

A minor controversy occurred when Vanderbilt canceled games at home with Northwestern and away games with Ohio State. A letter was sent cancelling the games, the explicit reason being the need to accommodate Mizzou into Vanderbilt's SEC East Division. Northwestern, like Vanderbilt in the SEC the sole private institution in the Big Ten, alleged that the real reason was fear on the part of Vanderbilt to continue playing its Big Ten counterpart—a series which had been referred to as the Battle of the Nerds.

Additionally, Vanderbilt's 25 combined wins in Franklin's three years in charge was the Commodores' highest total in school history. Franklin finished his Vanderbilt career with a record of 24–15 (an average of 8 wins per year).

Penn State
On January 11, 2014, the Athletic Department at Penn State announced the appointment of Franklin as the head football coach of the Penn State Nittany Lions. Penn State agreed to pay $1.5 million that Franklin owed Vanderbilt for early termination of his contract, Penn State disclosed this information January 24, 2014, according to USA TODAY Sports. He received a six-year contract, which paid him $4.3 million for the 2014 season, including a $300,000 retention bonus payable if he was Penn State's coach on December 31, 2014. He had an annual guaranteed pay increase of $100,000 along with retention bonuses, plus performance incentives each year. During his first few press  conferences, he had said how he wanted Penn State to again be the most dominant school in recruiting in Pennsylvania.

Franklin's departure from Vanderbilt was not without controversy, as his sudden move to Penn State upset most of Vanderbilt's fans. In the days following the move to Penn State; on January 7, 2014, James Franklin was forced to discuss the gang rape allegations by four of his former players at Vanderbilt. Penn State University President Rodney Erickson and Director of Athletics Dave Joyner said a deep background search and intense interview questions left them confident that hiring Franklin would not bring any more damage to Penn State University, which was still working through the Jerry Sandusky child sex abuse scandal that damaged the program in 2011.

"He has been through the most thorough vetting process that any individual has gone through at the university," Erickson said after a press conference at Beaver Stadium where Franklin made his first official appearance as a leader of Penn State.

"I've responded to some people who've said, 'I sure hope you've done your due diligence,'" Joyner said. "And I've told them, 'Trust me. We have done a very thorough vetting of this and we feel comfortable with the situation.' We're very, very careful and very methodical about doing that."

2014 season

2015 season

2016 season

During the 2016 season, Penn State started the season 2–2, but Franklin rallied his team to win the next eight games, winning the Big Ten's East Division, followed by a victory over Wisconsin in the 2016 Big Ten Football Championship Game. For his team's turn around, Franklin was named the Dave McClain Coach of the Year in the Big Ten.

On August 18, 2017, Penn State announced that Franklin signed a six-year contract extension worth $5.738 million a year. That deal includes retention bonuses paid at the end of each year of the contract.

"My family and I are very thankful to be a part of the Penn State community," Franklin said in a statement. "I am pleased with the progress our program has made in the community, in the classroom and on the field. I look forward to diligently working with President Barron and Director of Athletics Sandy Barbour on implementing a plan that puts our University and our student-athletes in the best position to compete on the field and in life."

Penn State announced Franklin will make $4.3 million during the 2017 season as part of a contract will escalate each year through the 2022 season in which he will make $6.3 million. He has a $2 million buyout for the 2017 season and a $1 million buyout for every subsequent year.

In addition to the guaranteed money, Franklin's contract has incentives including $800,000 for a national title, $400,000 for a College Football Playoff appearance and $350,000 for winning the Big Ten Championship Game. His incentives are capped at $1 million per year.

2017 season

In 2017, Franklin led the Nittany Lions to another 10–2 regular season, 7–2 in Big Ten Games. They ended the season by defeating the Washington Huskies in the 2017 Fiesta Bowl, 35–28. Penn State finished the season 11–2, ranked #8 in both the AP and Coaches Poll.

2018 season

Prior to the 2018 season, Penn State lost several key contributors from the previous seasons. Offensive coordinator Joe Moorhead left to become the head coach at Mississippi State, star Running Back Saquon Barkley was drafted as the 2nd overall draft pick by the New York Giants, and Tight End Mike Gesicki was drafted by the Miami Dolphins. The Nittany Lions took a step back from their recent success, finishing their regular season 9–3 overall and 6–3 in conference games. Following the regular season they played Kentucky in the Citrus Bowl, losing 27–24. Penn State finished the season 9–4, ranked #17 in the AP and Coaches Poll.

2019 season

The Nittany Lions finished the 2019 season 11–2, and had a conference record of 7–2. They received an invitation to the 2019 Cotton Bowl Classic where they defeated the #17 2019 Memphis Tigers 53–39. Penn State finished the 2019 season ranked #9 in both the AP Poll and Coaches Poll.
Recently, Penn State announced at the end of the 2019 regular season that the Board of Trustees had confirmed unanimous approval of an extension of James Franklin contract after rumored interest from several other programs including the USC Trojans and Florida State Seminoles.

2020 season

Penn State got off to their worst start in school history in 2020, starting 0–5. They were able to rebound, however, by winning their last four games after that to finish 4–5. The season was scarred early on by the sudden retirement of starting running back Journey Brown due to a heart disease.

2021 season

Penn State finished the regular season 7–5, and 4–5 in Big Ten play. The Nittany Lions, started the season off with a 5–0 record and with wins over #12 Wisconsin and #22 Auburn were ranked as high as #4 in the country. However, after an injury sustained by quarterback Sean Clifford, the team struggled towards the end of the season winning just two out of their final seven games. Prior to the regular-season finale against Michigan State, Franklin agreed to a 10-year, $75 million extension to remain as Penn State's head football coach through the 2031 season. The team was invited to the Outback Bowl and a matchup with Arkansas, the first ever meeting between the two schools. The Nittany Lions were defeated by a score of 24–10 to finish the season 7-6.

2022 season

Personal life
While serving as the tight ends coach at Washington State, Franklin first met his wife Fumi (then a student at Washington State) in 1998. Franklin was a graduate assistant coaching tight ends and pursuing a master's degree in educational leadership. They were re-introduced when Franklin was coaching at Maryland several years later. They began a long-distance relationship that led to an engagement in Green Bay, where Franklin worked in 2005. The Franklins have two daughters, Addy and Shola.

Philanthropy
James Franklin was named Penn State's 43rd Annual Renaissance Fund honoree in 2019. The Renaissance Fund dinner was held on October 30, 2019, at the Bryce Jordan Center on the campus of Penn State. The dinner raised over $287,600 for endowed scholarships at Penn State.

Since arriving at Penn State, his teams have devoted hundreds of hours each semester to service, including an annual team trip to the Penn State Children's Hospital at the Milton S. Hershey Medical Center to visit with young children battling pediatric cancers. Franklin has spoken at every THON since 2014, and the Franklin family has generously supported THON through annual gifts including a $10,000 gift made in honor of football players Charlie Shuman, Nick Scott.

Franklin has also been an ardent supporter of "Be the Match," encouraging community members to join the national bone marrow registry.

Prior to Penn State's 2019 appearance in the Cotton Bowl, James Franklin matched a $10,000 donation from Goodyear to the Children's Medical Center Dallas.

Head coaching record

References

External links
Penn State profile
 

1972 births
Living people
American football quarterbacks
East Stroudsburg Warriors football coaches
East Stroudsburg Warriors football players
Green Bay Packers coaches
Idaho State Bengals football coaches
James Madison Dukes football coaches
Kansas State Wildcats football coaches
Kutztown Golden Bears football coaches
Maryland Terrapins football coaches
Penn State Nittany Lions football coaches
Vanderbilt Commodores football coaches
Washington State Cougars football coaches
People from Langhorne, Pennsylvania
Sportspeople from Bucks County, Pennsylvania
Coaches of American football from Pennsylvania
Players of American football from Pennsylvania
African-American coaches of American football
African-American players of American football